The ANR National Award was instituted by the Akkineni International foundation in the honor of Akkineni Nageswara Rao. The award was given annually to recognize people for their lifetime achievements and contributions to the Indian film industry. ANR National Award was first awarded to veteran Bollywood actor Dev Anand in 2006.

Winners of the ANR Award 
2019: Rekha
2018: Sridevi
2017: S S Rajamouli
 2014: Amitabh Bachchan
 2012: Shyam Benegal
 2011: Hema Malini
 2010: K. Balachander
 2009: Lata Mangeshkar
 2008: Vyjayanthimala
 2007: Anjali Devi & Jayasudha
 2006: Shabana Azmi
 2006: Dev Anand

See also 
 Dadasaheb Phalke Award
 NTR National Award
 Raghupathi Venkaiah Award
 Dr.K. Balachander's Profile
Annapurna Studios - Awards

References

Indian film awards
Lifetime achievement awards